The Central District of Natanz County is a district (bakhsh) in Natanz County, Isfahan Province, Iran. At the 2006 census, its population was 20,736, in 6,808 families.  The District has two cities: Natanz & Tarq. The District has three rural districts (dehestan): Barzrud Rural District, Karkas Rural District, and Tarq Rud Rural District.

References 

Natanz County
Districts of Isfahan Province